Glenn Richard McQuillen (April 19, 1915 – June 8, 1989), known also as "Red", was an American professional baseball player. During a 210-game, five-season career in Major League Baseball, all with the St. Louis Browns, he was a reserve outfielder, playing mainly in left field.

In his first professional and Major League game, he hit a double as a pinch hitter off Johnny Marcum of the Boston Red Sox, collecting his first run batted in during a 12–8 loss at Sportsman's Park. McQullen batted an MLB career-high .284 that season, collecting 33 hits in 43 games with St. Louis. He then spent 1939, 1940 and most of 1941 in minor league baseball at the upper levels of the Browns' farm system.

McQuillen enlisted in the United States Navy before the 1943 season, serving on the destroyer  in the Pacific Theater of Operations for three years before rejoining the Browns during the 1946 and 1947 seasons. In , he again spent a full season with the Browns, but he could not crack their starting outfield and his batting mark fell to .241.

In a five-season MLB career, McQuillen was a .274 hitter (176-for-643) with four home runs and 75 RBI in 210 games. Following his major league stint, he spent 10 years playing and managing in the minors, leaving baseball after the 1956 season.

McQuillen died in Gardenville, Maryland, at the age of 74.

References

External links
Baseball Reference
Retrosheet
Baseball in Wartime
The Deadball Era

1915 births
1988 deaths
Amarillo Gold Sox players
United States Navy personnel of World War II
Atlanta Crackers players
Baltimore Orioles (IL) players
Baseball players from Virginia
Charleston Rebels players
Charleston Senators players
Clovis Pioneers players
Lincoln Chiefs players
Little Rock Travelers players
Lubbock Hubbers players
Major League Baseball left fielders
People from Strasburg, Virginia
St. Louis Browns players
San Antonio Missions players
Springfield Cubs players
Syracuse Chiefs managers
Toledo Mud Hens players
Williamsport Grays players